Aspidistra cryptantha is a species of flowering plant.

Description
This species is a perennial herb. Its cataphylls are short-lived, leaving remnants at the base of young leaves. It also counts with 4 to 6 veins at each side.

Distribution
Aspidistra cryptantha is known only from its type locality, in Trà Lĩnh District, Cao Bằng Province, Vietnam.

References

Further reading
Tillich, H‐J. "An updated and improved determination key for Aspidistra Ker‐Gawl.(Ruscaceae, Monocotyledons)." Feddes Repertorium 119.5‐6 (2008): 449–462.
Tillich, Hans-Juergen. "The genus Aspidistra Ker-Gawl.(Asparagaceae) in Vietnam." Taiwania 59.1 (2014): 1–8.

External links

cryptantha
Flora of Vietnam
Plants described in 2007